DGX might refer to:

 Nvidia DGX, a series of super computer nodes
 MOD St Athan (IATA: DGX), a Ministry of Defence airfield connected to the RAF (British Royal Air Force)
 DGX, a division of Dollar General
 Quest Diagnostics (NYSE: DGX)
 A type of bullet, see .460 Weatherby Magnum
 A series of Yamaha portable grand pianos